Sverre Norberg (born 5 September 1953 in Horten, Norway) is a Norwegian sport rower. He was born in Horten. He competed at the 1976 Summer Olympics in Montreal.

References

External links 
 

1953 births
Living people
People from Horten
Norwegian male rowers
Olympic rowers of Norway
Rowers at the 1976 Summer Olympics
Sportspeople from Vestfold og Telemark